Studstrup is the northernmost suburb of Aarhus, Denmark with a population of 827 (1 January 2022).

Studstrup is home to the 700 MW power plant Studstupværket. The smoke stack is a landmark across the entire Aarhus Bay area.

External links
Studstrup.dk

References

Towns and settlements in Aarhus Municipality
Cities and towns in Aarhus Municipality